Berville-sur-Seine (literally Berville on Seine) is a commune in the Seine-Maritime department in the Normandy region in northern France.

Geography
A ferry connects the commune with the neighbouring town of Duclair.

Population

Places of interest
 The church of St.Lubin, dating from the sixteenth century.
 A sixteenth-century stone cross.
 A timber-framed manorhouse with an exterior staircase.

See also
Communes of the Seine-Maritime department

References

Communes of Seine-Maritime